David Byrne (b. 1983 in Stevenage) is a British playwright and the artistic director of the New Diorama Theatre in Camden, London. Byrne has also written for radio and television.

Byrne has won the Writers' Guild of Great Britain and the List Awards for Drama, a Les Enfants Terribles Prize and the London Off West End award for Best Artistic Director.

Byrne's adaptation of Down and Out in Paris and London sold out at the Edinburgh Festival in 2015 and received multiple four and five star reviews before transferring to London.

The New Diorama Theatre, under Byrne's artistic directorship, has won two Empty Space Peter Brook Awards.

References

Living people
1983 births
English dramatists and playwrights